Reflections is a 1981 album by Akira Terao which was the best-selling album of the 1980s in Japan.

Tracklist 
All music was written by Akira Terao with arrangements by Akira Inoue.

References

1981 albums
Japanese-language albums